Chiranjeevi Sarja (died 7 June 2020) was an Indian actor who appeared in Kannada films. Hailing from a family of actors, Sarja acted in more than 20 films in a career spanning 11 years.

Early life and family
Sarja was born as the first child of Ammaji and Vijay Kumar. He comes from a family of people associated with South Indian film industry; his maternal grandfather Shakti Prasad, uncle Arjun Sarja and younger brother Dhruva Sarja are all actors, while another uncle Kishore Sarja was a director. He completed his schooling from Baldwin Boys' High School before graduating from Vijaya College, Bangalore. He worked as an assistant director with his uncle Arjun for about four years.

Career
Sarja appeared in 22 films, beginning with the 2009 film Vayuputra which was directed by his uncle Kishore Sarja and earned him the Innovative Film Award for Best Debut (Male). A number of his films were remakes of other language films, including the action film Varadhanayaka (2013), the supernatural thriller Whistle (2013), the horror comedy Chandralekha (2014), the action film Rudra Tandava (2015) and the action thriller Amma I Love You (2018). Among other notable films of Sarja include the mystery thriller Aatagara (2015), which was based on Agatha Christie's book And Then There Were None, and the horror film Aake (2017), both of which were directed by K. M. Chaitanya.

Three of Sarja's films were released in 2020; Shivarjuna turned out to be his last appearance before his death. He had five more films lined up which are in various stages of production.

Personal life 

In October 2017, he was engaged to actress Meghana Raj. They got married in a Christian ceremony on 30 April 2018, followed by a traditional Hindu wedding ceremony on 2 May 2018 at Palace Grounds. At the time of his death, they were expecting their first child.

His son Raayan Raj Sarja was born on 22 October 2020, four months after his death.

Death 

On 6 June 2020, Sarja suffered convulsions and complained of breathlessness. The following day, he developed chest pain and collapsed around 1:10 p.m. (IST). He was taken to a private hospital in Jayanagar in "an unresponsive state"; the doctors declared him dead at 3:48 p.m. (IST), citing cardiac arrest as the cause of death.

Sarja's body was laid in repose at his residence in Basavanagudi where actors, politicians and fans visited to pay their respects. His funeral was held on 8 June at Dhruva Sarja's farmhouse on Kanakapura Road.

Filmography

Notes

References

External links 

1980 births
2020 deaths
21st-century Indian male actors
Indian male film actors
Male actors from Bangalore
Male actors in Kannada cinema